Admiral Neville may refer to:

John Neville, 3rd Baron Neville (c. 1337–1388), English admiral
Richard Neville, 16th Earl of Warwick (1428–1471), English Lord High Admiral
William Neville, 1st Earl of Kent (c. 1405–1463), English Lord Admiral

See also
John Nevell (died 1697), British Royal Navy rear admiral